

Colin Richard Francis Eggleston (23 September 1941, Melbourne – 10 August 2002, Geneva) was an Australian writer and director of TV and films. He began his career making police dramas for Crawford Productions.

Select credits
A Day in the Life of Robin Beckett (1963) (Short Film)
Doctor Who (1967) (TV series)
Homicide (TV series)
Ryan (1969) (TV series)
The Long Arm (1970) (TV series)
Matlock Police (1973–74) (TV series)
Division 4 (1974) (TV series)
The Box (1974) (TV series) – writer
The Bluestone Boys (1976) (TV series) – writer
Bluey (1976) (TV series) – writer of ep "The Whole of Life", "The Changeling"
Fantasm Comes Again (1977)
Chopper Squad (1977) (TV series)
Long Weekend (1978)
Nightmares (1980) – producer
Bellamy (1981) (TV series)
Airhawk (1981) – producer
The Little Feller (1982)
Innocent Prey (1983)
Sky Pirates (1986)
Body Business (1986) (TV movie)
Cassandra (1987)
Outback Vampires (1987)

Unmade films
Academy (announced 1983) – a film about a secret academy of killers

References

External links
 
Colin Eggleston at AustLit

Australian film directors
Australian film producers
Australian screenwriters
1941 births
2002 deaths
20th-century Australian screenwriters